"From Here to Paternity" is an episode of the BBC sitcom, The Green Green Grass. It was first screened on 25 December 2006, as the 2006 Christmas special.

Synopsis

When Llewellyn arrives accusing the Boyce's dog, Earl, of seducing his pedigree collie, Blodwyn, who is now pregnant, trouble starts to brew in the village. Boycie doesn't want his reputation to be scarred by having a sexually orientated pet so he denies everything until Llewellyn produces a photograph of the crime to which Marlene replies 'that's canine pornography!'

Things get a whole lot worse, when Mrs Cakeworthy overhears the Boyces talking about it and she assumes they're talking about Tyler getting Beth pregnant. Then when Marlene and Boycie confront Tyler he thinks that they mean that Mrs Cakeworthy is pregnant. Spiralling out of control, the rumours get more and more wild until Ray, Beth's dad, decides to get nasty. When Boycie decides to tell the staff that Mrs Cakeworthy is pregnant her husband shows up and the following conversation leads to Boycie receiving another black eye.

Meanwhile, Mrs Cakeworthy is named Tai Chi Student of the Month, Tyler has a real Christmas surprise for Beth – a horse, and Jed, Elgin and Bryan are convinced that the strange, terrible creature Old Bones has come back to stalk the land, consuming everything in its path. Or maybe they're just trying to scare Boycie and pocket some extra money.

Episode cast

Notes
 This episode is the second Christmas Special.
 This episode marks the first appearance of the character Ray.

References

British TV Comedy Guide for The Green Green Grass
BARB viewing figures

2006 British television episodes
The Green Green Grass episodes